Olearia minor, is a small flowering shrub in the family Asteraceae. It has alternate leaves and white to pale mauve daisy-like flowers from winter to December. It grows in Western Australia, South Australia, New South Wales, and Victoria.

Description
The single flowers are densely clustered,  in diameter and borne at the end of branches, attached either with or without a stalk. Flowering occurs from June to December.

Taxonomy
This daisy was first formally described in 1867 by George Bentham who gave it the name Olearia pimeleoides var. minor in Flora Australiensis. In 1991, Nicholas Lander raised the variety to species status as Olearia minor and the change was published in the journal Telopea.

Distribution and habitat
This species grows in mallee or open scrubland on loam or yellow brown sand or rocky slopes mostly around Balranald district, Dubbo and the Budawang Range in New South Wales. In Victoria a scattered distribution on loamy soils with mallee in the north-west near Bambill to near the Little Desert and dry forest in the northern Brisbane Ranges and Werribbee Gorge. In South Australia, this daisy-bush is widely distributed in the south of the state, including on Kangaroo Island. In Western Australia it grows in sandstone, limestone, sand dunes or rocky slopes amongst mallee or scrubland near Coolgardie, Esperance and the wheatbelt.

References

minor
Asterales of Australia
Flora of New South Wales
Flora of Victoria (Australia)
Flora of South Australia
Flora of Western Australia
Plants described in 1867
Taxa named by George Bentham